Frederick James Pethard (born 7 October 1950) is a former Scottish professional footballer. He was born in Glasgow.

Pethard began his career at Celtic but failed to make an impact on the first team and was released by the club. He signed for Cardiff City initially as understudy to the full back pairing of David Carver and Gary Bell but he eventually managed to break into the side and held his place for several years, despite suffering a number of minor injuries. He left in 1979 and signed for Torquay United where he spent three years before leaving league football. After leaving football Fred joined Devon Probation Service and subsequently became the manager of the Torbay Youth Offending Team.

References

1950 births
Footballers from Glasgow
Scottish footballers
Cardiff City F.C. players
Torquay United F.C. players
English Football League players
Living people
Celtic F.C. players
Association football fullbacks